Planetfest was a music festival staged yearly by what used to be WPLA Planet Radio 107.3 in Jacksonville, Florida at Metropolitan Park. It was started in 1999 and, with the exception of 2001, has continued every year since then. The show is known for its relatively low ticket prices for the large number of national and local bands. The event featured some of the biggest names in indie rock and attendance has grown each year.

For WPLA's 10th anniversary in 2005, the station held a "Mutha Shuckin' Birthday" in the Spring at the Expo Center of the Jacksonville Fairgrounds instead of Metropolitan Park.

Setup
Planetfest is a music festival with two stages for the performing musicians. The Main Stage is where the featured performers play 45-60+ minute sets with 30 minute breaks between acts for stage preparation and breakdown.

A smaller stage, called the JackRabbits Stage, is named after the local venue where a Battle of the Bands competition is held to select the local bands that will play at the festival. In 2008, that contest was scheduled to occur between September 21 and October 12. The top nine acts perform 30-45 minute sets at Planetfest.

Previous festivals

Planetfest 10
Concert date: November 14, 2009.
Attendance:  TBA
Ticket price: $15 deadbeat presale October 2 / $25 in advance / $35 at the gate
Main Acts:  Papa Roach, Chevelle, Jet, Framing Hanley, Skindred, Halestorm, Shawn Fisher & The Jukebox Gypsies (Jax band recently signed to Universal Republic), Adelitas Way, Name:Bran
Local Acts: The Embraced, Love Lies & Therapy, Down Theory, Sumthin Else, Supercollide, Broken Trust, Society Red, None Like Us, A Fall to Rise
Originally scheduled to appear: TBA

Planetfest 9
Concert date: November 8, 2008.
Attendance: 10,000 (sold out)
Ticket price: $15 deadbeat presale / $25 in advance / $35 at the gate
Main Acts:  Hinder, Shinedown, Puddle of Mudd, Red Jumpsuit Apparatus, Rehab, His Name Was Iron, Red
Local Acts: Ten West, Hollowpoint Militia, Harloe, Blistur, Penny 4 Your Thought, Shawn Fisher and the Jukebox Gypsies (Now Son Of A Badman), JoEveritt, The Embraced, Name: Bran
Originally scheduled to appear: N/A

Planetfest 8
Concert date: November 17, 2007.
Attendance: almost 12,000
Ticket price: $25 prior to the show / $35 at the gate
Main Acts: Breaking Benjamin, Drowning Pool, Finger 11, Seether, Trapt, Amaru
Local Acts: Harloe, Penny for Your Thoughts, Amidine, Secret State, JoEveritt, Hollowpoint Militia, Pliny the Younger, Five Star Failure, Devereux
Originally scheduled to appear: Sum 41. Due to an injury, they canceled their remaining tour appearances, including Planetfest 8.

Planetfest 7
Concert date: November 18, 2006
Attendance: 10,000+
Ticket price: $20 in advance, $30 at the gate
Main Acts: Buckcherry, Crossfade, The Red Jumpsuit Apparatus, Hinder, 18 Visions, Hoobastank, Candlebox, Bound
Local Acts: Dummo, Decidedly, Feedback, Amidine, Fidelity Crisis, Harloe, Down Theory, Dang and Embraced.
Originally scheduled to appear: Blue October—Not there due to Injury
Notes: Lex and Terry presented Red Jumpsuit with a "Best of Jax" award for best local band. The city put a limit of 10,000 tickets for the event, resulting in a sell-out crowd. It was the first sell-out since 2003 when Staind headlined the festival.

Planetfest 6 
Concert date: November 20, 2005
Attendance:
Ticket price: $20 in advance; $30 day of show.
Main Acts: Allele, Cold, P.O.D., Shinedown, Silvertide
Local Acts: Nonpoint, The Red Jumpsuit Apparatus

Mutha Shuckin' Birthday 
Concert date:  May 8, 2005
Attendance:
Ticket price: $25 in advance/$35 day of show
Main Acts: 3 Doors Down, Alter Bridge,  Breaking Benjamin, The Exies, No Address, Skindred, Sum 41, Thirty Seconds to Mars, Unwritten Law
Notes: Mutha Shuckin' Birthday celebrated the ten-year anniversary of WPLA in Jacksonville.  While Planetfest takes place in the fall at Jacksonville's Metropolitan Park, Mutha Shuckin' Birthday took place in the spring at the Jacksonville Expo Center Fairgrounds.

Planetfest 5 
Concert date:   October 24, 2004
Attendance: 8,000+
Ticket price: $18
Main Acts: Authority Zero, Chevelle, Future Leaders of the World, Papa Roach, Saliva, Skindred

Planetfest 4 
Concert date:  October 19, 2003
Attendance:
Ticket price: $15 Advanced $22 Day of Show
Main Acts: Authority Zero, Sevendust, Shinedown, Staind, Ünloco
Local Acts: Allele, Burn Season, Yellowcard

Planetfest 3 
Concert date: September 22, 2002
Attendance:
Ticket price: $13 in advance, $20 day at the gate
Main Acts: Audiovent, Earshot, Kidneythieves, Off By One, Sevendust, Shinedown, Unwritten Law, The Used
Local Acts: The Weekend

Planetfest 2 
Concert date: October 21, 2000
Attendance:
Ticket price:
Main Acts: 8stops7, Battery, Dexter Freebish, Dust for Life, Fenix*TX, Fuel, Lifehouse, Nine Days, The Union Underground

Planetfest 
Concert date: October 24, 1999
Attendance:
Ticket price:
Main Acts: Days of the New, Eve 6, Jimmie's Chicken Shack, Joydrop, Lifehouse, Shades Apart, Splender, Stroke 9
Local Acts: Big Sky, Tether's End
Notes: Lifehouse recorded video for their 2001 hit single "Hanging By A Moment", though the footage from the concert was never used for the music video

References 

Pictures from Planetfest 10
http://photos.jacksonville.com/mycapture/category.asp?eventID=889497&CategoryID=10519

External links 
PlanetFest8 website
Planet 107.3 Radio

Music festivals in Florida
Music of Jacksonville, Florida
1999 establishments in Florida
Music festivals established in 1999
2010 disestablishments in Florida
Recurring events disestablished in 2010